The 2003 Wofford Terriers football team was an American football team that represented Wofford College as a member of the Southern Conference (SoCon) during the 2003 NCAA Division I-AA football season. In their 16th year under head coachMike Ayers, the Terriers compiled an overall record of 12–2 with a conference mark of 8–0, and finished as SoCon champion. Wofford advanced to the NCAA Division I-AA Football Championship playoffs, where they defeated  and Western Kentucky before they lost at Delaware in the first semifinals.

Schedule

References

Wofford
Wofford Terriers football seasons
Southern Conference football champion seasons
Wofford